Estadio Pedro Selva is a professional baseball stadium, home of the "CAFETEROS DE CARAZO" the team that represents the city of Jinotepe and also the Carazo department in the German Pomares baseball league, and Professional Baseball League of Nicaragua. The stadium has also been used for soccer and was the home of the track and field teams "Xilotepel" and "Carazo".

Its name is a tribute to one of the best baseball players Nicaragua has ever produced, Carazo's own Pedro Selva. "El Bambino"
won four triple crowns in his illustrious career (1971, 1972, 1973, and 1975).

References

Carazo Department